The women's artistic gymnastics balance beam final at the 2018 Summer Youth Olympics was held at the America Pavilion on 15 October.

Qualification 

Qualification took place on 10 October. Tang Xijing from China qualified in first, followed by Ukraine's Anastasiia Bachynska and Ksenia Klimenko of Russia.

The reserves were:

Medalists

Results 
Oldest and youngest competitors

References 

Girls' balance beam